Rungnarai Kiatmuu9 is a Thai Muay Thai fighter, originally from Buriram, in the northeast of Thailand.

Biography and career

Rungnarai started Muay Thai at 8 years old in a small camp called Lukhokphet near his village. At 14 he went to live at the Kiatmoo9 gym.

In July 2019 Rungnarai received the 2018 Sports Writers Association of Thailand Fighter of the Year Award but lost by Knockout shortly after to Yothin FA Group which led the Association to strip him of his title and decide that no fighters were worthy of it that year, this decision was highly controversial in the Muay Thai community.

Titles and accomplishment
Professional Boxing Association of Thailand (PAT) 
2013 Thailand 108lbs Champion
Rajadamnern Stadium 
2016 Rajadamnern Satadium 108lbs Champion
Lumpinee Stadium
2018 Lumpinee Stadium 115lbs Champion
True4U 
 112lbs True4u Muaymumwansuek Champion (2017)
 118lbs True4u Muaymumwansuek Champion (2019)

Awards
 2018 Sports Writers Association of Thailand Fighter of the Year (revoked)

Fight record

|-  style="background:#fbb;"
| 2020-11-06|| Loss||align=left| Puenkon Tor.Surat  || True4U Muaymanwansuk, Rangsit Stadium || Rangsit, Thailand ||KO (Elbow)||4 ||1:45
|-  style="background:#fbb;"
| 2020-09-11|| Loss ||align=left| Satanmuanglek PetchyindeeAcademy || True4U Muaymanwansuk, Rangsit Stadium ||Rangsit, Thailand || Decision (Unanimous)||5  || 3:00
|-
! style=background:white colspan=9 |
|-  style="background:#cfc;"
| 2020-07-24 || Win ||align=left| Puenkon Tor.Surat || True4U Muaymanwansuk, Rangsit Stadium || Rangsit, Thailand || Decision || 5 || 3:00
|-  style="background:#cfc;"
| 2020-02-26|| Win ||align=left| Chanalert Meenayothin || Rajadamnern Stadium||Bangkok, Thailand || Decision || 5 || 3:00
|-  style="background:#cfc;"
| 2020-01-31|| Win ||align=left| Phetsommai Sor.Sommai || Phuket Super Fight Real Muay Thai || Mueang Phuket District, Thailand || Decision || 5||3:00
|-  style="background:#FFBBBB;"
| 2019-12-13|| Loss ||align=left| Chanalert Meenayothin || Lumpinee Stadium||Bangkok, Thailand || Decision (Split)|| 5 || 3:00
|-
! style=background:white colspan=9 |
|-  style="background:#FFBBBB;"
| 2019-10-06|| Loss ||align=left| Kaito Wor.Wanchai || Suk Wanchai MuayThai Super Fight vol.6 ||Nagoya, Japan || KO (Body shot)  || 3 || 
|-
! style=background:white colspan=9 |
|-  style="background:#CCFFCC;"
| 2019-08-09|| Win ||align=left| Phetsommai Sor.Sommai || Lumpinee Stadium ||Bangkok, Thailand || Decision || 5 || 3:00
|-
! style=background:white colspan=9 |
|-  style="background:#FFBBBB;"
| 2019-07-05|| Loss ||align=left| Yothin FA Group || Muaymanwansuk + Petchpiya Lumpinee Stadium ||Bangkok, Thailand || KO (Right elbow)  || 3 ||
|-  style="background:#CCFFCC;"
| 2019-06-07|| Win ||align=left| Diesellek Wor.Wanchai || Muaymanwansuk + Petchpiya Lumpinee Stadium ||Bangkok, Thailand || Decision || 5 || 3:00
|-
! style=background:white colspan=9 |
|-  style="background:#CCFFCC;"
| 2019-05-09|| Win ||align=left| Dansiam Khrudamgym || Rajadamnern Stadium ||Bangkok, Thailand || Decision || 5 || 3:00
|-  style="background:#FFBBBB;"
| 2019-02-21|| Loss ||align=left| Detchaiya PetchyindeeAcademy || Rajadamnern Stadium || Thailand || KO (Left hook) || 2 || 2:50
|-  style="background:#CCFFCC;"
| 2019-01-17|| Win ||align=left| Detchaiya PetchyindeeAcademy || Rajadamnern Stadium || Thailand || Decision || 5 || 3:00
|-  style="background:#CCFFCC;"
| 2018-12-07|| Win ||align=left| Jomhod Eminentair || Lumpinee Stadium || Bangkok, Thailand || Decision || 5 || 3:00 
|-
! style=background:white colspan=9 |
|-  style="background:#CCFFCC;"
| 2018-10-05|| Win ||align=left| Watcharapon P.K.Saenchaimuaythaigym || Muay Thai Expo: The Legend of Muay Thai || Buriram, Thailand || Decision || 5 || 3:00
|-  style="background:#c5d2ea;"
| 2018-09-04|| Draw ||align=left| Phetphuthai Sitsarawatseua|| Lumpinee Stadium || Bangkok, Thailand || Decision || 5 || 3:00
|-  style="background:#CCFFCC;"
| 2018-08-07|| Win ||align=left| Kiew Parunchai || Lumpinee Stadium || Bangkok, Thailand || Decision || 5 || 3:00
|-  style="background:#CCFFCC;"
| 2018-07-05|| Win ||align=left| Phetsuphan Por.Daorungruang || Rajadamnern Stadium || Bangkok, Thailand || Decision || 5 || 3:00
|-  style="background:#CCFFCC;"
| 2018-06-11|| Win ||align=left| Palangpon PetchyindeeAcademy || Rajadamnern Stadium || Bangkok, Thailand || Decision || 5 || 3:00
|-  style="background:#CCFFCC;"
| 2018-05-09|| Win ||align=left| Phetmuangchon Por.Suantong || Rajadamnern Stadium || Bangkok, Thailand || Decision || 5 || 3:00
|-  style="background:#CCFFCC;"
| 2018-04-09|| Win ||align=left|  Achanai PetchyindeeAcademy || Rajadamnern Stadium || Bangkok, Thailand || Decision || 5 || 3:00
|-  style="background:#CCFFCC;"
| 2018-03-07|| Win ||align=left| Kimluay Santiaubol || Rajadamnern Stadium || Bangkok, Thailand || Decision || 5 || 3:00
|-  style="background:#FFBBBB;"
| 2018-01-31|| Loss ||align=left|  Achanai PetchyindeeAcademy || Rajadamnern Stadium || Bangkok, Thailand || Decision || 5 || 3:00
|-  style="background:#CCFFCC;"
| 2017-12-22|| Win ||align=left| Palangpon PetchyindeeAcademy || True4U Muaymanwansuk || Saraburi Province, Thailand || Decision || 5 || 3:00 
|-
! style=background:white colspan=9 |
|-  style="background:#FFBBBB;"
| 2017-11-16|| Loss ||align=left| Phetmuangchon Por.Suantong || Rajadamnern Stadium || Bangkok, Thailand || Decision || 5 || 3:00
|-  style="background:#FFBBBB;"
| 2017-10-15|| Loss ||align=left| Daniel McGowan || YOKKAO 28 || Bolton, England || KO (Left Hook) || 3 || 2:05
|-  style="background:#FFBBBB;"
| 2017-08-03|| Loss ||align=left| Phetmuangchon Por.Suantong || Rajadamnern Stadium || Bangkok, Thailand || Decision || 5 || 3:00
|-  style="background:#CCFFCC;"
| 2017-06-05|| Win ||align=left| Saoek Kesagym || Rajadamnern Stadium || Bangkok, Thailand || Decision || 5 || 3:00
|-  style="background:#CCFFCC;"
| 2017-05-04|| Win ||align=left| Palangpon PetchyindeeAcademy || Rajadamnern Stadium || Bangkok, Thailand || Decision || 5 || 3:00
|-  style="background:#CCFFCC;"
| 2017-04-07|| Win ||align=left| Nongyot Sitjakan || Lumpinee Stadium || Bangkok, Thailand || Decision || 5 || 3:00
|-  style="background:#FFBBBB;"
| 2017-03-08|| Loss ||align=left| Sarawut Sor.Jor.Toypadriw || Rajadamnern Stadium || Bangkok, Thailand || Decision || 5 || 3:00
|-  style="background:#CCFFCC;"
| 2017-02-04|| Win ||align=left| Palangpon PetchyindeeAcademy ||  || Isan, Thailand || Decision || 5 || 3:00
|-  style="background:#CCFFCC;"
| 2016-12-28|| Win ||align=left| Sarawut Sor.Jor.Toypadriw || Rajadamnern Stadium || Bangkok, Thailand || Decision || 5 || 3:00
|-  style="background:#CCFFCC;"
| 2016-11-22|| Win ||align=left| Banlangnoen Suwasangmancha || Lumpinee Stadium || Bangkok, Thailand || Decision || 5 || 3:00
|-  style="background:#CCFFCC;"
| 2016-09-23|| Win ||align=left| Priewpark Sor.Jor.Vichitpedriew || Lumpinee Stadium || Bangkok, Thailand || Decision || 5 || 3:00
|-  style="background:#FFBBBB;"
| 2016-09-02|| Loss ||align=left| Ongree Sor.Dechaphan || Lumpinee Stadium || Bangkok, Thailand || Decision || 5 || 3:00
|-  style="background:#FFBBBB;"
| 2016-07-27|| Loss ||align=left| Sarawut Sor.Jor.Toypadriw || Rajadamnern Stadium || Bangkok, Thailand || Decision || 5 || 3:00
|-  style="background:#FFBBBB;"
| 2016-06-20|| Loss ||align=left| Nongyot Sitjakan || Rajadamnern Stadium || Bangkok, Thailand || Decision || 5 || 3:00
|-  style="background:#CCFFCC;"
| 2016-05-09|| Win ||align=left| Satanmuanglek Numpornthep || Rajadamnern Stadium || Bangkok, Thailand || KO (Right high kick) || 3 ||  
|-
! style=background:white colspan=9 |
|-  style="background:#CCFFCC;"
| 2016-03-22|| Win ||align=left| Thanadet Thor.Pran49 || Lumpinee Stadium || Bangkok, Thailand || Decision || 5 || 3:00
|-  style="background:#c5d2ea;"
| 2016-02-29|| Draw ||align=left| Nongyot Sitjakan || Rajadamnern Stadium || Bangkok, Thailand || Decision || 5 || 3:00
|-  style="background:#CCFFCC;"
| 2016-02-04|| Win ||align=left| Yokmorakot Parethongchareonyon || Rajadamnern Stadium || Bangkok, Thailand || Decision || 5 || 3:00
|-  style="background:#CCFFCC;"
| 2015-12-27|| Win ||align=left|  Detkart Por.Pongsawang || Siam Omnoi Stadium || Bangkok, Thailand || KO || 3 ||
|-  style="background:#c5d2ea;"
| 2015-12-08|| Draw ||align=left|  Achanai PetchyindeeAcademy || Lumpinee Stadium || Bangkok, Thailand || Decision || 5 || 3:00
|-  style="background:#FFBBBB;"
| 2015-11-09|| Loss ||align=left| Palangpon PetchyindeeAcademy || Rajadamnern Stadium || Bangkok, Thailand || Decision || 5 || 3:00
|-  style="background:#FFBBBB;"
| 2015-10-09|| Loss ||align=left| Ronachai Tor.Ramintra || Lumpinee Stadium || Bangkok, Thailand || Decision || 5 || 3:00
|-  style="background:#CCFFCC;"
| 2015-09-15|| Win ||align=left| Nongyot Sitjakan || Lumpinee Stadium || Bangkok, Thailand || Decision || 5 || 3:00
|-  style="background:#CCFFCC;"
| 2015-08-11|| Win ||align=left| Satanmuanglek Numpornthep || Rajadamnern Stadium || Bangkok, Thailand || Decision || 5 || 3:00
|-  style="background:#FFBBBB;"
| 2015-07-20|| Loss ||align=left| Palangpon PetchyindeeAcademy || Rajadamnern Stadium || Thailand || Decision || 5 || 3:00
|-  style="background:#CCFFCC;"
| 2015-06-11|| Win ||align=left|  Thanadet Thor.Pran49 || Lumpinee Stadium || Bangkok, Thailand || TKO || 4 ||
|-  style="background:#CCFFCC;"
| 2015-05-13|| Win ||align=left| Palangpon PetchyindeeAcademy || Rajadamnern Stadium || Thailand || Decision || 5 || 3:00
|-  style="background:#CCFFCC;"
| 2015-04-02|| Win ||align=left| Satanmuanglek Numpornthep || Rajadamnern Stadium || Bangkok, Thailand || Decision || 5 || 3:00
|-  style="background:#CCFFCC;"
| 2015-03-07|| Win ||align=left| Konkobdai Wor.Wiwatananont || Lumpinee Stadium || Bangkok, Thailand || Decision || 5 || 3:00
|-  style="background:#CCFFCC;"
| 2015-01-26|| Win ||align=left| Satanmuanglek Numpornthep || Rajadamnern Stadium || Bangkok, Thailand || Decision || 5 || 3:00
|-  style="background:#CCFFCC;"
| 2014-10-28|| Win ||align=left| Sam-D PetchyindeeAcademy || Rajadamnern Stadium || Bangkok, Thailand || Decision || 5 || 3:00
|-  style="background:#CCFFCC;"
| 2014-09-29|| Win ||align=left|  Achanai PetchyindeeAcademy || Rajadamnern Stadium || Bangkok, Thailand || Decision || 5 || 3:00
|-  style="background:#CCFFCC;"
| 2014-08-28|| Win ||align=left|  Khunhahn Sitthongsak || Rajadamnern Stadium || Bangkok, Thailand || Decision || 5 || 3:00
|-  style="background:#FFBBBB;"
| 2014-07-27|| Loss ||align=left| Thanadet Thor.Pran49	|| Rangsit Stadium || Rangsit, Thailand || Decision || 5 || 3:00
|-  style="background:#FFBBBB;"
| 2014-01-21|| Loss ||align=left|  Ploysiam PetchyindeeAcademy || Lumpinee Stadium || Bangkok, Thailand || Decision || 5 || 3:00
|-  style="background:#FFBBBB;"
| 2013-11-01|| Loss ||align=left| Newlukrak Pakornsurin || Lumpinee Stadium || Bangkok, Thailand || KO (Right Hook) || 3 ||
|-  style="background:#FFBBBB;"
| 2013-08-09|| Loss ||align=left| Sam-D PetchyindeeAcademy || Lumpinee Stadium || Bangkok, Thailand || Decision || 5 || 3:00 
|-
! style=background:white colspan=9 |
|-  style="background:#CCFFCC;"
| 2013-07-11|| Win ||align=left| Sam-D PetchyindeeAcademy || Lumpinee Stadium || Bangkok, Thailand || Decision || 5 || 3:00
|-  style="background:#FFBBBB;"
| 2013-06-12|| Loss ||align=left| Ploysiam Petchyindeeacademy || Rajadamnern Stadium || Bangkok, Thailand || Decision || 5 || 3:00
|-  style="background:#CCFFCC;"
| 2013-05-09|| Win ||align=left| Sam-D PetchyindeeAcademy || Rajadamnern Stadium || Bangkok, Thailand || Decision || 5 || 3:00
|-  style="background:#CCFFCC;"
| 2013-03-15|| Win ||align=left| Baikarn Wor Sangthep || Lumpinee Stadium || Bangkok, Thailand || KO || 3 || 3:00 
|-
! style=background:white colspan=9 |
|-
| colspan=9 | Legend:

References

Rungnarai Kiatmuu9
Living people
1995 births
Rungnarai Kiatmuu9